Michel Verrault is a Canadian short-track speed skating referee from Lac Beauport, Quebec. He recited the Judges Oath at the 2010 Winter Olympics in Vancouver, alongside Hayley Wickenheiser for the Athletes' Oath.
Verrault took the oath in French, while Wickenheiser did hers in English. Verrault has officiated at four previous Olympics, including the 1988 Winter Olympics in Calgary, Alberta, Canada.

References

Canadian referees and umpires
Olympic officials
Year of birth missing (living people)
People from Capitale-Nationale
Living people
Oath takers at the Olympic Games